The Mayor is a 1997 Italian comedy-drama film directed by Ugo Fabrizio Giordani. It is based on the Eduardo De Filippo's play Il sindaco del Rione Sanità.

Cast 
Anthony Quinn:  Antonio Barracano
Raoul Bova: Rafiluccio Santaniello
Maria Grazia Cucinotta: Rituccia
Lino Troisi: Fabio Della Ragione
Anna Bonaiuto: Armida
Romina Mondello: Geraldina
Franco Citti: Arturo Santaniello
Gaetano Amato: Pasquale 'o naso

References

External links

1997 films
Italian comedy-drama films
1997 comedy-drama films
Italian films based on plays
Films based on works by Eduardo De Filippo
1990s Italian films